Ōhō Kōnosuke (Japanese: 王鵬 幸之介, born February 14, 2000, as Kōnosuke Naya (納谷 幸之介, Naya Kōnosuke)) is a Japanese professional sumo wrestler from Kōtō, Tokyo. Wrestling for Ōtake stable, he made his professional debut in January 2018. He reached the second-highest jūryō division in January 2021 and entered the makuuchi ranks the following year. His highest rank has been maegashira 8. He is the son of former sekiwake Takatōriki and the grandson of 48th yokozuna Taihō.

Career 

He began sumo in elementary school, where he did reasonably well in tournaments despite having what he later admitted was a lazy attitude due to buying into his family legacy. He later went to Saitama Sakae High School, famous for its sumo program, where he was a classmate of fellow future sekitori Kotoshōhō. From here, his performance improved and by his final year of high school, he was captain of the sumo team and had won several tournaments.

It was expected that he would join Ōtake stable immediately after graduation, which was founded by his grandfather Taihō and formerly owned and operated by his father Takatōriki. However, he elected to postpone his debut in professional sumo in order to compete in the 2017 All Japan Sumo Championships.

He made his professional debut in January 2018, competing under his own name. In his first tournament on the banzuke in March 2018 he won the jonokuchi division championship after finishing with a 7–0 record. He reached the makushita division in September 2018, and competed exclusively in makushita in 2019 and 2020. He eventually earned promotion to jūryō after finishing with a 6–1 record at the top makushita rank.

His ascent to sekitori status saw him take the shikona Ōhō, with the "Ō" kanji "王" being able to be pronounced phonetically the same as "大" (read: ō or dai), which is commonly used by wrestlers of Otake stable in deference to both Taihō and the current stablemaster (former jūryō Dairyū). The "Ho" kanji "鵬" is taken directly from Taihō's shikona.

Ōhō's debut tournament at jūryō in January 2021 ended with a disappointing 5–10 record, seeing him immediately demoted back to makushita. He was, however, able to bounce straight back to jūryō after winning four of his seven bouts in March. He would post winning records in three of his next four tournaments, with two of those in double digits. His 11-win performance at jūryō 7 in November 2021 was enough to promote him to the top makuuchi division for the January 2022 tournament. Speaking to reporters after the banzuke was announced confirming him at maegashira 18, Ohō said he was looking forward to competing in the top division. He said that he thought his grandfather, who died aged 72 in 2013, was cheering him on in heaven. In his  debut Ōhō began well with seven wins in his first ten bouts, but he lost his last five to finish on 7–8, which Ōho later put down to a lack of concentration. He again produced a losing record in his second top division tournament, scoring 6–9. In the July 2022 tournament, he achieved his first winning record in the top-division, the 8-7 score earning him his new career high rank of  13. The following tournament in September saw Ōho once again start strongly but stumble in the second week, starting 7-3 but losing his last five matches to again finish with a losing 7-8 record.

The November 2022 tournament saw Ōhō's best result in the top division to date. On Day 12 he defeated Hōshōryū to move to 10–2, sharing the lead with Hōshōryū and Takayasu. However he lost the lead to Takayasu the following day. Ending the tournament with a 10-5 record, Oho was promoted to his highest rank to date, maegashira 8.

Fighting style 
Ōhō prefers pushing and thrusting techniques (tsuki/oshi). He regularly wins by oshidashi (front push out), yorikiri (frontal force out) and oshitaoshi (front push down).

Career record

See also 

 List of active sumo wrestlers
 Glossary of sumo terms

References

External links 
 

Japanese sumo wrestlers
2000 births
Living people
Sumo people from Tokyo